The College of Engineering and Management Punnapra is an educational institution established in 2008 under the Co-operative Academy of Professional Education. The College is affiliated to Kerala University(till 2015) and A.P.J Abdul Kalam Technical University ( KTU) (from 2015) and is approved by All India Council for Technical Education (AICTE).

The Institution is currently holding the place of one of the largest engineering workshop in kerala. Fully controlled and funded by Govt of kerala.

Courses
B.Tech Courses (UG) - Duration - 4 Years

 Civil Engineering -  4 Year Course - 60 seats
 Computer Science and Engineering -  4 Year Course - 60 seats
Electronics and Communication Engineering -  4 Year Course - 60 seats
Electrical and Electronics Engineering -  4 Year Course - 60 seats
Information Technology -  4 Year Course - 60 seats

M.Tech Courses (PG) - Duration - 2 Years

Computer Science & Engineering - 2 Year Course - 18 seats
Mechanical Engineering - 2 Year Course - 18 seats

Admission

Admission of students are carried out by the basis of the ranks obtained in the state-level Common Entrance Exam, conducted by the Commissioner of Entrance Examination(CEE).

Location 

The College is situated inside CAPE Campus or City Of Knowledge which is an education healthcare campus consist of many other institutions like Institute of Management & Technology(IMT), Kerala Institute of Making the Best(KIMB), Sagara Hospital. All these institutions situated in Punnapra North near Alappuzha. It is about 4 km from Alappuzha town which is commonly known as Venice of The East.

Facilities 

 Canteen
 1 Boys Hostel
 1 Girls Hostel 
 Central Park 
 State Bank Of India (SBI) ATM
 Post Office - (Vadakkal Alappuzha - 688003)
 Career Guidance and Placement Unit
 Central Library
 Indoor Badminton Court
 Auditorium
 Stationery shop
 Gymnasium (proposed)
 Student's Vehicle Parking Shed

About 
All the events are under the care of govt of kerala. The admissions to the free/merit seats and management seats are through the Central Allotment Process conducted by the Controller of Entrance Examinations, government of Kerala. The proportion of seats are as follows : free/merit seats 50%, management seats 35% (as aforementioned allotment to both these categories are through the Central Allotment Process ), the remaining 15% seats come under the NRI quota.

Placement
The placement cell provides the opportunity for the final year students to attend campus interviews with organizations and arranges in-industry training for students. Main recruiters include Tata Consultancy Services, IBS Software Services, Amazon, Logidots, UST Global, Mindtree etc.

Activities

Atharva-'19 
National Technical event conducted in 2019. Including varieties of workshop, games, DJ.

Atharva-'20 
National Technical event conducted in 2020.

Dextra 
Cultural Festival of CEMP

See also 
 List of Engineering Colleges in Kerala
 Co-operative Academy of Professional Education
 KEAM
 All India Council for Technical Education

Reference

External links

Engineering colleges in Kerala
Colleges affiliated to the University of Kerala
Universities and colleges in Alappuzha district
Educational institutions established in 2008
2008 establishments in Kerala